Avletim (also Афлатун - Aflatun) is a village in Jalal-Abad Region of Kyrgyzstan. Its population was 2,732 in 2021.

References

Sources 
Aflatun Map – Maplandia.com

Populated places in Jalal-Abad Region